The infra-auricular deep parotid lymph nodes are a group of lymph nodes found underneath the ear.

References 

Lymphatics of the head and neck